Kuterem (Kütärem) is a rural locality (a selo) in Kelteyevsky Selsoviet, Kaltasinsky District, Bashkortostan, Russia. The population was 1,081 as of 2010. There are 16 streets.

Geography 
Kuterem is located 20 km west of Kaltasy (the district's administrative centre) by road. Bolshoy Keltey is the nearest rural locality.

References 

Rural localities in Kaltasinsky District
Birsky Uyezd